Cadwallader "Cad" Coles (January 17, 1886 - June 30, 1942) was an outfielder who played for the Kansas City Packers of the Federal League in . He was educated at Clemson University. Coles drowned in Miami, Florida at the age of 56.

External links

1886 births
1942 deaths
Major League Baseball outfielders
Kansas City Packers players
Baseball players from South Carolina
Accidental deaths in Florida
Deaths by drowning in the United States
Clemson University alumni
Spartanburg Spartans players
Augusta Tourists players
Augusta Orphans players
Binghamton Bingoes players
Elmira Colonels players
Baltimore Orioles (IL) players
New Haven White Wings players
Scranton Miners players